Gian Paolo Pillitteri (born 5 December 1940) is a former Italian Democratic Socialist Party politician and film critic. He was also affiliated with the Italian Socialist Party from 1976 to 1994. He was born in Sesto Calende, Province of Varese, Lombardy. He served in the Chamber of Deputies of Italy in Legislature IX (1983–1987) and Legislature XI (1992–1994). He was mayor of Milan from 1986 to 1992.

He is married to Rosilde Craxi, sister of the former leader of the Italian Socialist Party, Bettino Craxi.

References

External links

 
 

1940 births
Living people
People from the Province of Varese
Italian Democratic Socialist Party politicians
Italian Socialist Party politicians
Deputies of Legislature IX of Italy
Deputies of Legislature XI of Italy
Mayors of Milan
Italian film critics